Alfredo Zegarra Tejada Florentino (born October 16, 1951) is a Peruvian politician and the current mayor of Arequipa. He has held the post since 2011. From 2003 to 2010, he was mayor of José Luis Bustamante District. He studied at the National University of Saint Augustine, and is married to Nelly Molina. Before entering politics, he was a physician.

References

20th-century Peruvian physicians
Living people
1951 births
People from Arequipa
Mayors of places in Peru
National University of Saint Augustine alumni